Dominic Constantine, Prince of Löwenstein-Wertheim-Rochefort (16 May 1762 – 18 April 1814) was the fourth and last reigning Prince of the Rochefort line of the House of Löwenstein-Wertheim.

He was born in Nancy as the third child and first son of Prince Theodor Alexander of Löwenstein-Wertheim-Rochefort (1722 - 1780), seventh and youngest son of Dominic Marquard, 3rd Prince of Löwenstein-Wertheim-Rochefort (1690 - 1735), and his wife Countess Luise of Leiningen-Dachsburg-Hartenburg (1735 - 1805) a granddaughter of Johann Friedrich, Count of Leiningen-Hartenburg (1661-1722). Throughout his parents were born six children, but only two reached adulthood.

He was baptized on the same day of his birth in the parish church of San Rocco in Nancy. He grew up in Strasbourg, where he also attended the military school. In Fulda he began a serious course of study under the supervision of a tutor, and since it was foreseeable that he would be the successor to his uncle Charles Thomas, he settled in Wertheim in 1783.

On 5 May 1780 he married in Nancy Princess Leopoldine of Hohenlohe-Bartenstein, by whom he had seven children:

Princess Luise Josepha of Löwenstein-Wertheim-Rochefort (1781 - 1785)
Princess Christiane Henriette Polyxena of Löwenstein-Wertheim-Rosenberg (1782 - 1811) married on 25 July 1805 Franz Thaddaus, 2nd Prince of Waldburg zu Zeil und Trauchburg and had issue
Charles Thomas, 5th Prince of Löwenstein-Wertheim-Rosenberg (1783 - 1849) married in 1799 Countess Sophie of Windisch-Grätz and had issue
Princess Josepha Luise of Löwenstein-Wertheim-Rochefort (1784 - 1789) 
Prince Constantin Ludwig Carl Franz di Löwenstein-Wertheim-Rosenberg (1786 - 1844) married his niece Leopoldine, daughter of his brother Charles Thomas, without issue
Princess Louise Christiane Charlotte of Löwenstein-Wertheim-Rochefort (1788 - 1799) 
Prince Wilhelm Theodor Ludwig Constantin of Löwenstein-Wertheim-Rosenberg (1795 - 1838) married morganatically in 1833 Emilie David, created by Louis II, Grand Duke of Hesse in 1838 Baroness von Habitzheim; they have no children.

After the death of his first wife he married Countess Maria Kreszentia of Königsegg-Rothenfels and had three more children:

 Prince August Chrisostomus Carl of Löwenstein-Wertheim-Rosenberg (1808 - 1874) unmarried
 Prince Maximilian Franz of Löwenstein-Wertheim-Rosenberg (1810 - 1884) unmarried
 Princess Maria Josefine Sophie of Löwenstein-Wertheim-Rosenberg (1814 - 1876) married first in 1841 Prince Franz Joseph of  Salm-Salm and had one daughter, after his husband death she married in 1845 Prince Carl of Solms-Braunfels son of Prince Friedrich Wilhelm of Solms-Braunfels and Princess Friederike of Mecklenburg-Strelitz.

Bibliography 
 Martina Heine: Der letzte Fürst des Alten Reiches. In: Wertheimer Zeitung. vom 16. Mai 2012.

External links 
 Stammbaum

1762 births
1814 deaths
Nobility from Nancy, France
House of Löwenstein-Wertheim